The Third Battle of Gao was fought in the city of Gao on 9–11 February 2013, during the Northern Mali Conflict. It was a raid on the city by rebel MOJWA forces. The raiders were defeated by Malian government forces with the support of troops from France.

The battle 
On Saturday, February 9, a would-be suicide bomber was shot dead in the evening before being able to detonate his explosive device. On Sunday, February 10, 2013 Islamic rebels with the Movement for Oneness and Jihad in West Africa launched a raid on the city, possibly from the Adrar des Ifoghas mountains. According to French General Bernard Barrera, the militants used motorcycles and pirogues via the Niger River to infiltrate the city. Fighting began around 2 PM near the central police station in downtown Gao, and later spread across the city, lasting for several hours. French helicopters intervened to help Malian soldiers pinned down by the rebels. Malian gendarme Colonel Saliou Maiga told Reuters the insurgents intended to carry out suicide attacks in the town.

Malian soldiers counter-attacked and began shooting at the Islamists' position. Other Islamists hidden in surrounding buildings opened fire. French soldiers then arrived as reinforcements. The fighting around the police station stopped in the middle of the afternoon, but then continued near the governor's house. According to Malian Lieutenant-Colonel Mamadou Samaké "Islamist infiltrators in the city had been greatly reduced, there are many Islamists killed."

French troops stationed in the Korogoussou Gao International Airport which numbered around 900 men strong, were involved in the late afternoon, including an armored column which was sent to evacuate a dozen journalists trapped on Sharia Square (Independence Square).
The fighting was interrupted by dusk, but the next morning at 5:00, a French helicopter bombed and destroyed the Gao police station, thus ending the battle. Also, 6 civilians killed, and 11 to 15 injured during the battle.

References

2013 in Mali
Conflicts in 2013
Battles involving France
3rd Battle
Mali War
February 2013 events in Africa

Battles in 2013